Malasaña is an area in the centre of Madrid, Spain. It does not correspond to any administrative division, but it is often conflated with  Universidad, the wider administrative neighborhood on which Malasaña is located. The webpage providing touristic information published the Madrid City Council set as limits the streets of San Bernardo, the Gran Vía, Fuencarral and Carranza. Malasaña is associated with a creative and counter-cultural scene.

Overview
Malasaña is to the west of Chueca and to the east of Argüelles. It is surrounded by several metro stations and is a central neighbourhood of Madrid. Residents include Esperanza Aguirre, the former President of the Community of Madrid, amongst other politicians and several artists.

Malasaña is named after a 15-year-old girl Manuela Malasaña who once lived on San Andrés street. She was executed by the French following the uprising in 1808. Today, there is a street named in her honour very close to the roundabout Glorieta de Bilbao. The area's center is the Plaza del Dos de Mayo (in commemoration of a popular uprising on May 2, 1808, brutally repressed by the French troops and which started the Spanish Independence War)

Nightlife and commerce 
Malasaña is a vibrant neighborhood and a center for the 'hipster' phenomenon, full of lively bars and clubs overflowing with young people. Its creative and countercultural roots, which stretch back several decades, have led to the area's distinct musical and artistic tastes. Its streets are currently being renovated, making it a much more attractive quarter. It's one of the classic areas for partying the night away. This plaza hosts a large festival on the same day. Botellons (a meeting of people drinking openly on the street, often before going to bars or discos) are common in this neighbourhood. Large ones were held in Plaza de dos de Mayo before the police stopped the nightly practice after a festival turned awry in 2006. Botellon´s involving up to 200 people happen and the plaza where it occurs changes depending on how the police crack down on them. Parts of the neighbourhood closer to Gran Via are frequented by the solo aspect of nightlife including sex clubs, sex shops and street activity. Drugs are rarely sold openly on the street due to police crackdowns in the early 2000s (decade). It is common for foreign women and men to illegally sell beer openly all over the neighbourhood.

The nightlife is diverse in Malasaña, though the most common themes are unpretentious style places (alternative, funk, mainstream), mixed places (including some conspicuous LGBT, which have created a small gay scene distinct from that of nearby Chueca) and colourful or bohemian cafes. There are one or two bars for hard rock and metal, house, nudists, BDSM, gothic, Latin, classic, 1980s, hip-hop and other non-mainstream genres. Night life venues in the area include La Vía Láctea, Penta, Diplodocus, Nueva Visión, La Vaca Austera, and El Barco. Templo de Susu is a high-end retro clothing shop. Very bohemian cafes include Pepe Botella, La Paca, La Ida and Lolina Vintage Café. An American book shop and bar (J & J's Books and Coffee) sits on Calle Espíritu Santo near the Noviciado metro station.

It is unclear if Malasaña will maintain its alternative and hip atmosphere or if it will become more commercial and upmarket. Since 2017 the  Mercado de Fuencarral, an iconic shopping hub known for its industrial aesthetic and for housing alternative style shops, closed down in July 2015 after being bought by an investment fund.

Commercially, Malasaña has many fashion boutiques as well as shops for design and niche market products. They are often cutting-edge shops or feature progressive designers and products. They are often economical and rarely mainstream. There are many secondhand vintage shops, used book stores and unique gift shops. Calle Espíritu Santo represents the melange of Malasaña by having, on one full block alone, a retro shop, butchers with uncommon meats, a fancy pastry shop, two vintage shops, a small florist, vegetable shop, five bars, three bohemian cafes, a retro food shop, two ethnic restaurants, two mid-range restaurants, and a couple more traditional bars along with two hip-hop clothing shops.

Culture 
Malasaña is mentioned in a song by Manu Chao, surf instrumental Farawel Malasaña by Bambi Molesters from Croatia. Together with Chueca it hosted in October 2017 the Art Festival Los artistas del barrio, opening the doors of more than 70 venues to show the work of international and national artists like David Trullo, Pablo Sola, Daniel Garbade, Le frère, Pablo Kalafaker, Carmen Alvar, Rosa Guerrero, to mention a few. Film directors often used Malasaña as a set for their productions, so has  Marco Ferreri's in  El Cochecito (1960), Franklin J. Schaffner in Patton (1970), Fernando Colomo in Bajarse al moro (1989), Pedro Almodóvar in Pepi, Luci, Bom (1980) and in Law of Desire (1987), or Emilio Martínez Lázaro in The Worst Years of Our Lives  (1994). It was the center of the movida movement in late 1970s and 1980s Madrid.

Architecture 
The architecture in Malasaña is traditional but rather uniform, with most buildings ranging from 4 to 6 levels, 3 to 5 windows wide, each building painted a uniform colour, almost all windows with French balconies and rare ornamentation. A special site is Pedro de Ribera's Hospice, now the Municipal Museum on calle Fuencarral (in the Malasaña neighborhood), which exemplifies the evolution of the Castilian baroque style towards a more decorative aesthetic. Whereas the Conde Duque Cuartel, today a cultural center, and former barracks counts as a piece of Madrid's Bourbon architecture.

Rents are high for small space and some buildings are very exclusive.

References 

Neighbourhoods of Madrid
Entertainment districts in Spain